Ibtissam Tiskat ; born 3 October 1992) is a Moroccan songwriter who rose to popularity as a contestant in both the second season of Arab Idol and the tenth season of Star Academy Arab World. She made her commercial singing debut with "N'dir Mabghit" in September 2014.

Career

Star Academy 10 
Tiskat competed in the tenth season of Star Academy where she won the title of 'Miss Star Academy'. Tiskat was nominated twice on the show. For her first nomination she was brought back by public vote, achieving the season's highest vote percentage. During her second nomination, she stood alongside the Tunisian contestant Ghada Jeriedi and lost the public vote, which raised allegations that the show tampered with the results.

2014–present 
In March 2015, Tiskat released her second single "Maghribiya wa Aftakhir". In April 2015, she released a single with Abdel-salam Alzayed, "Enta Ya". In August 2015, she was a featured vocalist in Two Tone's song "Weli Liya". In 2016, Tiskat released her first khaliji song " MAFI MEN HABIBI" and won the murex d'or for the best rising star in middle east north Africa region. In December 2016 she released her 5th single "MENEK WLA MENI" in Moroccan dialect which had a big success and became top 1 hit for 4 months on Moroccan radio top chart.

Awards

WatsUp TV Africa Music Video Awards 

|-
|2016
|Ma Fi Mn HABIBI

|Best North African Video
|
|}

Discography 
 Erja3 Lia (2015)
Ndir Ma Bghit (2016)
Menak Wela Meni (2016)
Bghani B3youbi (2017)
Asher Jarh (2018)
Galbi Tlef (2019)
Rajaa Belour (2019)
Ana Wyah (2020)
Aliyam (2021)
Albnat Chofo Zine (2022)
Bghani B3youbi Solo (2022)

References 

Living people
21st-century Moroccan women singers
1992 births